Gaomidiannan Station is a station on the  of the Beijing Subway.

Station Layout 
The station has an underground island platform.

Exits 
There are 5 exits, lettered A, B1, B2, C1, and C2. Exit A is accessible.

References

External links

Beijing Subway stations in Daxing District
Railway stations in China opened in 2010